The Alma A. E. Holmes was a four-masted schooner that was used to transport coal. She sank on October 10, 1914, following a collision with the steamer Belfast.

The ship
The Alma Holmes was a 1,200-ton wooden-hulled ship built in 1896 in Camden, Maine, and named after the daughter of owner Joseph Holmes. She was 202 feet long, with a 41-foot beam and an 18-foot draft.

The wreck
On October 10, 1914, the Alma Holmes carried coal from Norfolk, Virginia, intended for Lehigh Coal Yards in Salem, Massachusetts. While off the coast of Marblehead, Massachusetts, in thick fog, she was hit on the starboard side by the steamer Belfast which smashed straight through the wooden hull of the Holmes. The Belfast had dug so deep into the hull of the Alma Holmes that the captain decided not to reverse until the crew had disembarked. After all crew members had been rescued, the Belfast reversed and in one minute's time the Alma Holmes sank. No one was killed during the episode.

External links

 
 

1896 ships
Shipwrecks of the Massachusetts coast
Sailing ships of the United States
Maritime incidents in October 1914
Ships sunk in collisions
Ships sunk with no fatalities
Shipwrecks in the Atlantic Ocean